The Byron Bay Record was weekly newspaper published every Saturday in Byron Bay, New South Wales, Australia from 6 September 1902 until 12 April 1924.

Overview
The Byron Bay Record was first published on 6 September 1902 by Alfred C. Burgess at his printing press office in Byron Bay. It was distributed weekly at a cost of 3d throughout the Northern Rivers region. The paper has been digitised on to Trove; an Australian library database aggregator owned by the National Library of Australia.

References

Weekly newspapers published in Australia
Newspapers published in New South Wales
Defunct newspapers published in New South Wales
Newspapers on Trove
Publications established in 1902
Byron Bay, New South Wales